This is a list of leaders and office-holders of Canada. See also Canadian incumbents by year.

Monarchs
 Monarchs of Canadian territories (1497–)
 Monarchs of Canada (1497–)

Federal

Governors General
 Governors General of Canada (1627–)

Heads of government 
Prime Ministers of Canada (1867–)
Premiers of the Province of Canada (1841–1867)

Cabinet ministers 
Also known as Ministers of the Crown
Cabinet of Canada
Deputy Prime Ministers of Canada (1977–)
Ministers of Agriculture (1867–)
Ministers of Canadian Heritage (1996–)
Ministers of Citizenship and Immigration (1994–)
Ministers of the Environment (1971–)
Ministers of Finance (1867–)
Ministers of Fisheries and Oceans (1979–)
Ministers of Foreign Affairs (1995–)
Ministers of Forestry (1990–1995)
Ministers of Health (1944–)
Ministers of Human Resources Development (1996–2003)
Ministers of Indian Affairs and Northern Development (1966–)
Ministers of Industry (1995–)
Ministers of Industry, Science and Technology (1990–1995)
Ministers of Intergovernmental Affairs (1993–)
Ministers for International Cooperation (1996–)
Ministers of International Trade (1983–)
Ministers of Justice (1867–)
Ministers of National Defence (1923–)
Ministers of Natural Resources (1995–)
Ministers of Pensions and National Health (1928–1944)
Ministers of Public Safety and Emergency Preparedness (2003–)
Ministers of Public Works and Government Services (1996–)
Ministers of Railways and Canals (1879–1936)
Ministers of Veterans Affairs (1944–)
Secretaries of State for External Affairs (1909–1995)

Parliamentary office-holders 
Leaders of the Opposition (1867–)
Canadian senators
Members of the Canadian House of Commons

Provinces

Lieutenant Governors
 Lieutenant Governors of Alberta
 Lieutenant Governors of British Columbia
 Lieutenant Governors of Manitoba
 Lieutenant Governors of New Brunswick
 Lieutenant Governors of Newfoundland and Labrador
 Lieutenant Governors of Nova Scotia
 Lieutenant Governors of Ontario
 Lieutenant Governors of Prince Edward Island
 Lieutenant Governors of Quebec
 Lieutenant Governors of Saskatchewan

Heads of government
Premiers of Alberta
Premiers of British Columbia
Premiers of Manitoba
Premiers of New Brunswick
Premiers of Newfoundland and Labrador
Premiers of Nova Scotia
Premiers of Ontario
Premiers of Prince Edward Island
Premiers of Quebec
Premiers of Saskatchewan

 for the premiers in any given year.

Executive councils

For the executive councils (cabinet) of each province, see Executive Council (Canada).

Territories

Unlike the provinces, the territories of Canada have no inherent jurisdiction and only have those powers delegated to them by the federal government.

Commissioners

Unlike the Governor General or a Lieutenant-Governor, who are representatives of the Queen of Canada, Commissioners are not vice-regal representatives. They are appointed by the federal government as a delegate of cabinet. Under the federal statutes governing the territories, the Commissioners act in accordance with written instructions from the cabinet or the minister responsible (currently the Minister of Indian Affairs and Northern Development).

Commissioners of Northwest Territories
Commissioners of Nunavut
Commissioners of Yukon

Heads of government
Premiers of the Northwest Territories
Premiers of Nunavut
Premiers of Yukon

Municipalities 

In Canada, incorporated municipalities are creations of the provincial and territorial governments. They have no independent existence under the Constitution.

List of mayors in Canada

See also 

Lists of office-holders